An Official Assignee is an officer in  the law court who distributes a bankrupt's assets to the creditors. He also assists the bankrupt to relieve of his obligations to the creditors.

Under the bankruptcy system operating in the United Kingdom before 1869, such officers were appointed by the Lord Chancellor, accountants or from the commercial world.

Notes

Bankruptcy in the United Kingdom
Insolvency law of the United Kingdom
Legal professions